William G. James (born January 8, 1930) was an American politician in the state of Florida.

James was born in Boynton Beach, Florida, and attended the University of Florida. He was an insurance agent. He served in the Florida House of Representatives for the 80th district, as a Republican. He was Minority Leader of the House from 1976 to 1978.

References

Living people
1930 births
Republican Party members of the Florida House of Representatives
People from Boynton Beach, Florida
University of Florida alumni
20th-century American politicians